Hossein Vafaei (born 15 October 1994) is an Iranian professional snooker player. He is the first professional player from Iran. He won his first ranking title at the 2022 Snooker Shoot Out, beating Mark Williams 1–0 (71–0) in the final. He dedicated this victory to his grandmother and mother because that day was mother's day in Iran. 

Vafaei made his Crucible debut at the 2022 World Snooker Championship, where he lost 4–10 to Judd Trump in the first round. He made his Masters debut at the 2023 event, replacing Zhao Xintong in the draw after the sport's governing body suspended Zhao amid a match-fixing investigation. Vafaei defeated Mark Selby 6–2 in the first round, but lost 4–6 to Jack Lisowski in the quarter-finals, despite equalling the tournament's highest break of 143 in the match.

Career

2009/2010 season
His first international tournament was the 2009 World Under-21 Amateur Snooker Championship. He reached the last 16 where he lost by five frames to three against Liu Chuang.

2010/2011 season
He participated in the 2010 Asian Games in Guangzhou, China in the snooker singles competition and was beaten 4–1 by Dechawat Poomjaeng in the last 16. In December 2010, he played in the World Amateur Snooker Championship and reached the last 16, where he lost 5–1 to Leo Fernandez.

In April 2011, he reached the final of ACBS Asian Under-21 Snooker Championship, but lost 7–3 to Cao Yupeng. Later in the month he participated in ACBS Asian Snooker Championship, however, he could not advance past the group stage. He competed in Group C, and finished in fourth place with one win and three losses.

2011/2012 season
In September 2011, he received a wildcard to participate at the Shanghai Masters, but could not advance to the first round as he lost 5–1 against Fergal O'Brien. In December, he won the World Amateur Snooker Championship by defeating Lee Walker 10–9 in the final. He won the title at the age of 17 years and 81 days, which made him the youngest ever winner of the tournament, breaking Ian Preece's record.

Vafaei received a wildcard to participate at the 2012 World Open, but lost 5–2 against Mark King. In April 2012, he won ACBS Asian Under-21 Snooker Championship, by defeating Zhang Anda 6–2 in the final. He reached the semi-finals of ACBS Asian Snooker Championship, where he lost 6–3 to Aditya Mehta.

Attempt to turn professional
He received a main snooker tour card courtesy of his World Amateur win to participate in the 2012/2013 and 2013/2014 seasons. However, due to visa problems he could only participate in the Six-red World Championship in Thailand, where he lost in the last 16 to Judd Trump, and APTC Event 2 in China, where he lost to Li Yuan in the last 64. It was a similar story in his second season as he only played in the World Games (lost 3–0 to Lü Haotian in the first round) and the Six-red World Championship (failed to advance beyond the group stage).

2014 IBSF World Under-21s Championship
In May 2014, Vafaei qualified as the top seed of his group at the 2014 IBSF World Under-21 Snooker Championship by losing only one frame in the preliminary stage.
He then beat Poland's Mateusz Baranowski 7–3 in the semi-finals, compiling the first 147 in the history of the tournament in the process. He won the title by defeating Josh Boileau 8–3 in the final.

Special dispensation for the 2014/15 season
In June 2014, Vafaei received a special dispensation to compete on the Main Tour for the 2014/15 season. In late February 2015, it was confirmed that Vafaei had gained a visa, leaving him able to enter the 2015 World Snooker Championship, where he lost 10–3 to Anthony McGill in the opening qualifying round.

2015/2016 season
The 2015 Australian Goldfields Open was the first ranking event of the 2015/2016 season and Vafaei qualified for it by beating Charlie Walters 5–3, Zak Surety 5–3, Lee Walker 5–4 and Dominic Dale 5–3. In his debut at the venue stage of a ranking event, Vafaei played Michael White in the opening round where he lost 5–3. He played in the UK Championship for the first time (losing 6–1 to Luca Brecel in the first round) and the Welsh Open (losing 4–2 to Robin Hull in the first round).

2016/2017 season
Vafaei enjoyed wins over Rod Lawler, Zak Surety, Sanderson Lam and Scott Donaldson at the Northern Ireland Open to reach his first ranking event quarter-final, where he lost 5–3 to Mark King. He also had a good run at the Welsh Open as he beat Lam, Christopher Keogan and Ali Carter to advance to the fourth round and he was defeated 4–1 by Judd Trump. A month after the Welsh Open, Vafaei also had a good run of form at the China Open, defeating Joe Perry 5–2, Ben Woollaston 5–4 and Rory McLeod 5–3. This booked him a place in the second ranking event quarter-final of his career within the space of a few months. His opponent was to be Judd Trump and Vafaei (the world number 74) was able to keep the world number two at bay and win by 5–3. He lost his first semi-final 6–1 to Mark Williams. After overcoming Hatem Yassen 10–1 and Matthew Selt 10–6, Vafaei was one win away from qualifying for the World Championship, but narrowly lost 10–8 to Tom Ford. He finished the campaign inside the top 64 in the world rankings and retained his place on the tour.

2021/2022 season

In January 2022, Vafaei won his first ranking title at the 2022 Snooker Shoot Out in Leicester, defeating Mark Williams in the final. He then went on to qualify for the World Snooker Championship for the first time in his career, where he lost 10-4 to Judd Trump in the first round at The Crucible.

2022/2023 season

Vafaei completed another victory over Mark Selby by defeating him 6–4 in the 2022 UK Championship. He made his first appearance Masters appearance at the 2023 event.

Performance and rankings timeline

Career finals

Ranking finals: 1 (1 title)

Pro-am finals: 1

Amateur finals: 4 (3 titles)

References

External links
Hossein Vafaei at worldsnooker.com
Hossein Vafaei at Instagram

Iranian snooker players
People from Abadan, Iran
Living people
1994 births
Cue sports players at the 2010 Asian Games
Asian Games competitors for Iran
Competitors at the 2013 World Games
Sportspeople from Khuzestan province